Lucas Zen (born June 17, 1991 in Rio de Janeiro), is a Brazilian football defensive midfielder. He currently plays for America-RJ

Career
Made professional debut for Botafogo in 2010.

Career statistics
(Correct )

References

External links
 
 ogol.com

1991 births
Living people
Brazilian footballers
Campeonato Brasileiro Série A players
Campeonato Brasileiro Série B players
Footballers at the 2011 Pan American Games
Botafogo de Futebol e Regatas players
Esporte Clube Vitória players
Paysandu Sport Club players
Brasiliense Futebol Clube players
Associação Atlética Portuguesa (RJ) players
Association football midfielders
Pan American Games competitors for Brazil
Footballers from Rio de Janeiro (city)